Domnall Ua Briain and Domhnall Ua Briain may refer to:

Domnall Gerrlámhach (died 1135), King of Dublin
Domnall mac Taidc (died 1115), King of the Isles, King of Thomond
Domnall Mór Ua Briain (died 1194), King of Thomond

See also
Donal O'Brien (disambiguation)